Colin Steele is a jazz trumpeter from Scotland.

He played pop music with Hue and Cry during the 1980s.

After two years in France he studied jazz at the Guildhall School of Music and Drama before returning to Scotland. He has been known for influences from Latin music and funk and has recorded several well-regarded albums.

He has been increasingly influenced by Scottish folk music, an influence carried into the additional instrumentation in his group Colin Steele's Stramash. as well as playing in Ceilidh Minogue's horn section

Discography
 2000 Twilight Dreams - Colin Steele - Caber (caber024)
 2003 The Journey Home - Colin Steele - Caber (caber029)
 2005 Through the Waves - Colin Steele Quintet - ACT (ACT 9436-2)
 2008 Stramash - Colin Steele - Gadgemo (GAD001)
 2017 Even in the darkest places- Colin Steele - Gadgemo (GAD002)
 2017 Diving for Pearls  - Colin Steele - Marina records (MA82)

References

External links
Colin Steele's website

Year of birth missing (living people)
Living people
Place of birth missing (living people)
Scottish jazz trumpeters
Male trumpeters
Alumni of the Guildhall School of Music and Drama
21st-century trumpeters
21st-century British male musicians
British male jazz musicians
ACT Music artists